Thunberginol G is a dihydroisocoumarin found in Hydrangeae Dulcis Folium, the processed leaves of Hydrangea macrophylla var. thunbergii.

References 

Dihydroisocoumarins
Catechols
3-Hydroxypropenals